Maksim Olegovich Karpov (born 17 March 1995) is a Russian football player who plays as a centre-back for Zvezda St. Petersburg.

Club career
Karpov made his professional debut in the Russian Professional Football League for farm club FC Zenit-2 St. Petersburg on 15 July 2013 in a game against FC Tosno. He made his debut for the senior squad of FC Zenit St. Petersburg on 23 November 2017 in a UEFA Europa League match against FK Vardar.

On 12 January 2018, Karpov joined SKA-Khabarovsk on loan for the remainder of the 2017–18 season.

On 13 January 2019, he joined Krylia Sovetov Samara on a permanent basis. On 2 September 2021, he moved to Khimki on loan.

Career statistics

Club

References

1995 births
Footballers from Saint Petersburg
Living people
Russian footballers
Association football defenders
Russia youth international footballers
Russia under-21 international footballers
FC Zenit-2 Saint Petersburg players
FC Zenit Saint Petersburg players
FC SKA-Khabarovsk players
FC Rotor Volgograd players
PFC Krylia Sovetov Samara players
FC Khimki players
FC Metallurg Lipetsk players
Russian Premier League players
Russian First League players
Russian Second League players